Thomas Presthus (born April 5, 1975 in Edina, Minnesota) is an American former soccer goalkeeper. He spent seven seasons in Major League Soccer and earned one cap with the U.S. national team in 1999.

Youth
Presthus grew up in Minnesota playing football and hockey. When he was twelve, he broke his neck. As a result, he began playing soccer and basketball.  He graduated from Edina High School. Presthus attended Southern Methodist University, playing on the men’s soccer team from 1993 to 1996.  He completed his bachelor’s degree in finance in 1997. In May 1994, he signed with the Minnesota Thunder of USISL.

Professional
In February 1997, D.C. United selected Presthus in the second round (20th overall) of the 1997 MLS College Draft. Presthus spent most of the 1997 as a backup to Scott Garlick. However, by the end of the 1998 season, Prestus had begun to emerge as United’s top goalkeeper and the team traded Garlick during the off-season.  

On February 5, 2001, United traded Presthus and a tenth round 2001 MLS SuperDraft pick to the Columbus Crew for third round pick in the 2001 MLS SuperDraft. Presthus became the Crew’s starting goalkeeper, but on July 23, 2003 he tore the ulnar collateral ligament in his right elbow during a game. He underwent surgery on September 30, 2003, but the rehabilitation went much slower than he expected. As a result, he announced his retirement on January 14, 2004.

National team
Presthus earned his lone cap with the U.S. national team in a 2-1 win over Chile on February 21, 1999. He replaced Zach Thornton at halftime with the score 0-0.

Post soccer career
After retiring from playing, Presthus became a financial planner with The Financial Solutions Network. He is now a Vice President with American Electric Power.

References

External links

MLS bio with stats

American soccer players
Major League Soccer players
United States men's international soccer players
USISL players
Association football goalkeepers
D.C. United players
Columbus Crew players
Minnesota Thunder players
SMU Mustangs men's soccer players
MLS Pro-40 players
A-League (1995–2004) players
D.C. United draft picks
Southern Methodist University alumni
1975 births
Living people
Edina High School alumni